Nie Chenxi (born July 1957) is a Chinese politician who served as director and Party branch secretary of National Radio and Television Administration from 2018 to 2022 and deputy head of Publicity Department of the Chinese Communist Party. He is a member of the 19th Central Committee of the Chinese Communist Party.

Biography
Nie was born in Lingshou County, Hebei, in July 1957. He entered the workforce in September 1974, and joined the Chinese Communist Party in February 1993. After resuming the college entrance examination, he was accepted to Fudan University, where he majored in program design at the Department of Computer Science. He worked the Hebei Provincial Government Research Office between 1992 and 1999, what he was promoted to deputy director in 1997. In 1999 Nie was transferred to Handan, a prefecture-level city located in the southwestern Hebei province. He became the Mayor in 2003, and then Communist Party Secretary, the top political position in the city, beginning in 2004. In 2006 he was promoted to become a Standing Committee member of the CCP Hebei Provincial Committee and director of the CCP Hebei Provincial Publicity Department. He was vice-governor of Hebei in 2011, but having held the position for only one year, then he was appointed deputy Party branch secretary of National Radio and Television Administration. In 2016 he was appointed deputy director of Publicity Department of the Chinese Communist Party. He concurrently served as president of the China Central Television (CCTV) between 2015 and 2018.

References

External links

1957 births
Fudan University alumni
University of Science and Technology of China alumni
Nanyang Technological University alumni
Central Party School of the Chinese Communist Party alumni
Tianjin University alumni
Renmin University of China alumni
Living people
People's Republic of China politicians from Hebei
Chinese Communist Party politicians from Hebei
Members of the 19th Central Committee of the Chinese Communist Party